Bisauli Assembly constituency is one of the 403 constituencies of the Uttar Pradesh Legislative Assembly, India. It is a part of the Badaun district and one of the five assembly constituencies in the Badaun Lok Sabha constituency. First election in this assembly constituency was held in 1957 after the "DPACO (1956)" (delimitation order) was passed in 1956. After the "Delimitation of Parliamentary and Assembly Constituencies Order" was passed in 2008, the constituency was assigned identification number 112.

Wards / Areas
Extent of Bisauli Assembly constituency is KCs Bisauli, Karanpur, Asafpur, PCs Singthara, Katgaon, Vagrain, Gargaia, Penpal, Agei, Uraina, Saidpur, Pusgawan, Hatra, Baraur Amanullapur, Khurrampur Bhamori, Rahedia, Byoli, Veerampur, Manakpur of Satasi KC, Bisauli MB, Mudia NP, Saidpur NP &  Faizganj NP of Bisauli Tehsil.

Members of the Legislative Assembly

Election results

2022

2012

See also
Budaun district
Badaun Lok Sabha constituency
Sixteenth Legislative Assembly of Uttar Pradesh
Uttar Pradesh Legislative Assembly
Vidhan Bhawan

References

External links
 

Assembly constituencies of Uttar Pradesh
Politics of Budaun district
Constituencies established in 1956